216 (two hundred [and] sixteen) is the natural number following 215 and preceding 217. It is a cube, and is often called Plato's number, although it is not certain that this is the number intended by Plato.

In mathematics 

216 is the cube of 6, and the sum of three cubes:
It is the smallest cube that can be represented as a sum of three positive cubes, making it the first nontrivial example for Euler's sum of powers conjecture. It is, moreover, the smallest number that can be represented as a sum of any number of distinct positive cubes in more than one way. It is a highly powerful number: the product  of the exponents in its prime factorization  is larger than the product of exponents of any smaller number.

Because there is no way to express it as the sum of the proper divisors of any other integer, it is an untouchable number. Although it is not a semiprime, the three closest numbers on either side of it are, making it the middle number between twin semiprime-triples, the smallest number with this property. Sun Zhiwei has conjectured that each natural number not equal to 216 can be written as either a triangular number or as a triangular number plus a prime number; however, this is not possible for 216. If the conjecture is true, 216 would be the only number for which this is not possible.

There are 216 ordered pairs of four-element permutations whose products generate all the other permutations on four elements. There are also 216 fixed hexominoes, the polyominoes made from 6 squares, joined edge-to-edge. Here "fixed" means that rotations or mirror reflections of hexominoes are considered to be distinct shapes.

In other fields
216 is one common interpretation of Plato's number, a number described in vague terms by Plato in the Republic.

There are 216 colors in the web-safe color palette, a  color cube.

In the game of checkers, there are 216 different positions that can be reached by the first three moves.

See also
The year 216
List of highways numbered 216

References

Integers